Popstars is the debut and only studio album by American musical group Eden's Crush, released in the United States by London-Sire Records and 143 Records on May 1, 2001. "Get Over Yourself" was its first single, followed by the album and group's last single "Love This Way". The album was executive produced by David Foster.

The album debuted at number six on the US Billboard 200 selling 99,000 copies. "Get Over Yourself" had been released in March 2001 and was a top ten hit in the United States and went to number one in Canada. Popstars received only moderate promotion due to financial restraints from the group's label, which was heading towards bankruptcy. Due to this, album sales were less than anticipated. Popstars did, however, go on to sell 500,000 copies in the United States, receiving a gold certification from the Recording Industry Association of America (RIAA). In Canada, Popstars peaked at number 17 and failed to match the success in the United States. The album was also released in Australia, United Kingdom, Japan and Brazil. The album is no longer in print and is unavailable on streaming services, such as Spotify and Apple Music.

Composition 
Eden's Crush recorded the album from November 2000 through February 2001. The album had to be recorded quickly in order to fit into the timing of the television show Popstars. David Foster, who was the lead producer for the album, assembled the team of producers, songwriters, sound engineers and musicians to work on the album.

Release and promotion 
Popstars was released in the United States, Canada, United Kingdom, Australia, Japan and Brazil by London-Sire Records and 143 Records on May 1, 2001.

Several of the album's tracks including "What's Good 4 the Goose", "Get Over Yourself", "Anywhere But Here", "Love This Way", "No Drama", I Wanna Be Free", "1,000 Words (Mil Palabras)", "You Know I Can" and "Promise Me" were featured heavily during the run of the Popstars television series.

The original title of the album was to be Heaven.

The group did a promo tour in the United States during the album's first week of release, including radio interviews and televised appearances on the Late Show with David Letterman, Live With Regis and Kelly, The View and MTV's Total Request Live. Other televised appearances include local WB network morning shows and on the Spanish-language programs ¡Despierta América!, El Gordo y la Flaca and Sábado Gigante.

Unknown to the public and the group (to a certain point), the group's label was going bankrupt and did not have the financial means to promote the album past August 2001.

Singles 
"Get Over Yourself" was the debut single released on March 13, 2001. The single was a hit, peaking in the United States at number eight on the Billboard Hot 100 and at number one on the Canadian Singles Chart.

"Love This Way" was the group's final single which was released in July 2001. Due to the label's financial troubles, the song was made into a promotional single with a limited amount of CD singles released in stores in the United States only.

Commercial performance 
Popstars debuted at number six on the US Billboard 200 selling 99,000 copies in its first week of release. The album went on to sell 500,000 copies in the United States, receiving a gold certification from the Recording Industry Association of America (RIAA) in July 2001. In Canada, it peaked at number 17 on the Canadian Albums Chart.

Track listing 

On the first pressing, track 13 was not listed. Future pressings do include the track in the track-listing. The CD was also released as an Enhanced CD in the United States and Canada. This version included behind the scenes content, photo and video galleries of the group, and links to the group's official website and the Popstars official website.

The Japanese release had 14 tracks. Track 13 was "Get Over Yourself (Main Mix)" and track 14 was "Promise Me".

David Foster co-wrote the album's 13th track "Promise Me" with his then-wife, Linda Thompson.

Charts

Certifications

References 

2001 debut albums
Teen pop albums